Kestrel High School was a small public charter high school in Prescott, Arizona. It was operated by Kestrel Schools, Inc. It opened in 2000, and its first graduating class was in 2001. It was accredited for the first time in 2000.

In the 2014–2015 school year, it changed its name to Prescott Preparatory Academy and announced new programs and a new focus "on helping kids to graduate." These programs included extra tutoring, life skills education, and after school programs. Currently the school is permanently closed.

References

Public high schools in Arizona
Schools in Yavapai County, Arizona
Charter schools in Arizona